Piyachanok Darit (born November 5, 1992) is a Thai professional footballer who plays as a centre back for Thai League 2 club Chiangmai (on loan from BG Pathum United).

Honours

Clubs
BG Pathum United
 Thai FA Cup (1) : 2014

Port
 Thai FA Cup (1) : 2019

References

External links
 Profile at Goal
https://us.soccerway.com/players/piyachanok-darit/348409/

1992 births
Living people
Piyachanok Darit
Piyachanok Darit
Association football central defenders
Piyachanok Darit
Piyachanok Darit
Piyachanok Darit
Piyachanok Darit